The third season of the American television comedy series Rules of Engagement premiered as a mid-season entry on March 2, 2009 and concluded on May 18, 2009. It consists of 13 episodes, each running approximately 22 minutes in length. CBS broadcast the third season at 9:30 pm in the United States, on Mondays except for one episode ("May Divorce Be With You") which was aired on Wednesday.

Cast

Main Cast
 Patrick Warburton as Jeff Bingham
 Megyn Price as Audrey Bingham
 Oliver Hudson as Adam Rhodes
 Bianca Kajlich as Jennifer Morgan
 David Spade as Russell Dunbar

Recurring Cast
 Adhir Kalyan as Timmy
 Orlando Jones as Brad
 Diane Sellers as Waitress

Episodes

Ratings

References

2009 American television seasons